The 2010 UEFS Futsal Men's Championship was the ninth men's UEFS futsal championship, held in Kaliningrad and Gusev (Russia) from May 3 to 8, with 11 national teams in the competition. 

European Union of Futsal (UEFS) organizes the European Championship biennially.

Teams

First round

Group A

Group B

Group C

Group D

Second round
Quarter finals

9th to 11th places

Final round

9-10 places

5-8 places

Semifinals

7-8 places

5-6 places

3-4 places

FINAL

Final standings

External links
UEFS website
UEFS blog

UEFS Futsal Men's Championship
UEFS
2010 in Russian football
International futsal competitions hosted by Russia